Olga Volkova may refer to:

 Olha Volkova (born 1986), Ukrainian freestyle skier
 Olga Volkova (actress) (born 1939), Russian actress